Gray death is a slang term which refers to a potent mixture of synthetic opioids, for example benzimidazole opioids or fentanyl analogues, often sold on the street as a proven substance. However, other substances such as stimulants have also been laced with opioids that resulted in deaths.

Etymology
The first batch of gray death had a characteristic gray color.

Detected samples
Samples have been found to contain heroin, fentanyl, carfentanil, and the designer drug U-47700. A mixture of drugs misleadingly called 2C-B had been laced with fentanyl in Argentina.

Deaths
In February 2022, 24 people in Argentina died after using cocaine cut with carfentanil.

Dangers
As with other illicit narcotics, gray death carries a higher risk of serious adverse effects than prescribed opioids due to the unknown and inconsistent composition of the product. As such, even experienced opioid users risk serious injury or death when taking this drug mixture.

Treatment
Reversing a gray death overdose may require multiple doses of naloxone. By contrast, an overdose from morphine or from high-purity heroin would ordinarily need only one dose. This difficulty is regularly encountered when treating overdoses of high-affinity opioids in the fentanyl chemical family or with buprenorphine. The greater affinity of these substances for the μ-opioid receptor impedes the activity of naloxone, which is an antagonist at the receptor. Increasing the dosage of naloxone or its frequency of administration may be required to counteract respiratory depression.

History
The substance first appeared in America and was thought to be a unique chemical compound before being identified as a mixture of drugs.

See also 
 List of opioids
 List of designer drugs
 Opioid epidemic in the United States
 Mickey Finn (drugs)
 Whoonga

References

External links
 

Designer drugs
Drug culture
English-language slang
History of South America
Adulteration
Issues in ethics